Olusegun Adeyemi is an Anglican archbishop in Nigeria he is Bishop of Kwara, one of seven in the  Anglican Province of Kwara, he is one of 14 archbishops within the Church of Nigeria. Adeyemi was elected Archbishop of the Anglican Province of Kwara in 2017.

He retired in 2019.

Notes

Anglican bishops of Kwara
21st-century Anglican bishops in Nigeria
21st-century Anglican archbishops
Anglican archbishops of Kwara
Year of birth missing (living people)
Living people